The Connecticut Department of Motor Vehicles is a state agency of Connecticut (in the United States) that manages state driver's licenses and vehicle registration. The agency has its headquarters in Wethersfield.

References

External links

 Connecticut Department of Motor Vehicles

State agencies of Connecticut